The Dong Feng 4 or DF-4 (also known as the CSS-3) is a first-generation two-stage Chinese intercontinental ballistic missile with liquid fuel (Nitric acid/Unsymmetrical dimethylhydrazine).  It was thought to be deployed in limited numbers in underground silos beginning in the late 1970s and early 1980s.  The Dong Feng 4 has a takeoff thrust of 1,224.00 kN, a takeoff weight of 82000 kg, a diameter of 2.25 m, a length of 28.05 m and a fin span of 2.74 m.  The range of the Dong Feng 4, which is equipped with a 2,190 kg nuclear warhead with 3.3 Megaton yield, with a nominal range of 5,500 km.  This gives it sufficient range to strike targets as far away as Russia, India, and American bases in the Pacific. The missile uses an inertial guidance system, resulting in a large CEP of 1,500 meters.  As of 2017, 10–15 launchers are deployed.

History

The decision to develop the DF-4 was made in 1965 in response to the U.S. ballistic missile submarine patrols that began operating out of Guam.  The missile's designer has been variously identified as Ren Xinmin or Tu Shou'e  [屠守锷], and it was produced at Factory 211 (Capital Astronautics Co. [首都航天机械公司], also known as Capital Machine Shop [首都机械厂]).

In 1972 US intelligence estimated an IOC for this system as being expected in 1974 or 1975. Deployment actually began in 1975–76, but only four DF-4s were believed to be in place by 1984.

There were two versions of the missile developed, one version housed in caves or garages to be rolled out on launch and another silo based version.

The US DoD estimates that the missile will continue to serve as a regional deterrence instrument until they can be replaced by the DF-31. This will be a significant capability gain for the Second Artillery Corps. The DF-31A has a range of 11,700 kilometers (as opposed to just 7,000 for the DF-4) and is road- and rail-mobile, and thus more survivable than the silo-based DF-4.

Operators 
 : The People's Liberation Army Rocket Force is the only operator of the Dong-Feng 4.

References

External links 
 Astronautix
 DongFeng 4 (CSS-3) Intermediate-Range Ballistic Missile - SinoDefence.com
 

Intercontinental ballistic missiles of the People's Republic of China
Nuclear missiles of the People's Republic of China
Military equipment introduced in the 1970s